Account Rendered is a 1932 British crime film directed by Leslie Howard Gordon and starring Cecil Ramage and Reginald Bach. It was made as a quota quickie at Cricklewood Studios.

Cast
 Cecil Ramage as Barry Barriter
 Reginald Bach as Hugh Preston
 Marilyn Mawn as Barbara Wayne
 Jessie Bateman as Mrs. Wayne
 Frederick Moyes as General Firmstone

References

Bibliography
Chibnall, Steve. Quota Quickies: The Birth of the British 'B' Film. British Film Institute, 2007.
Low, Rachael. Filmmaking in 1930s Britain. George Allen & Unwin, 1985.
Wood, Linda. British Films, 1927–1939. British Film Institute, 1986.

External links
 

1932 films
1932 crime films
1930s English-language films
British crime films
Films shot at Cricklewood Studios
British black-and-white films
1930s British films